Tetracha huedepohli is a species of tiger beetle that was described by Mandl in 1974, and is endemic to Santa Cruz, Bolivia.

References

Cicindelidae
Beetles described in 1974
Endemic fauna of Bolivia
Beetles of South America